Marcus Högberg (born 25 November 1994) is a Swedish professional ice hockey goaltender currently playing for Linköping HC of the Swedish Hockey League (SHL). Högberg was selected by the Ottawa Senators in the third round (78th overall) of the 2013 NHL Entry Draft.

Playing career
Högberg made his Swedish Hockey League debut playing with Linköping HC during the 2012–13 Elitserien season. On 17 March 2013, it was announced that Linköping would loan Högberg  to Mora IK of the lower HockeyAllsvenskan for the duration of the 2013–14 season.

After his fourth season in the SHL, Högberg was signed to a two-year entry-level contract with the Ottawa Senators on 30 March 2017. He was signed by AHL affiliate, the Binghamton Senators, to a professional try-out deal to close out the 2016–17 season.

Högberg split most of the 2017–18 season between the AHL Belleville Senators and the Senators ECHL team, the Brampton Beast.

Högberg began the 2018–19 season with the Belleville Senators. However, before he was able to play a game for the Senators that season, he was reassigned to the ECHL on 27 November. After being recalled back to the AHL, and playing in seven games, Högberg was recalled to the NHL on 22 December 2018. He was shortly thereafter reassigned to the AHL but eventually made his NHL debut on 29 December against the Washington Capitals. He made 21 saves in the 3–2 loss to the Capitals.

On 19 June 2019, Högberg was signed to a two-year contract extension, with the second year on a one-way basis with the Senators at $700,000.

As an impending free agent from the Senators after five seasons within the organization, Högberg opted to return to his original Swedish club, Linköping HC of the SHL, by agreeing to a four-year contract on 17 June 2021.

Career statistics

Regular season and playoffs

International

References

External links
 

1994 births
Living people
Belleville Senators players
Binghamton Senators players
Brampton Beast players
Swedish expatriate ice hockey players in Canada
Swedish expatriate ice hockey players in the United States
Linköping HC players
Mora IK players
IK Oskarshamn players
Ottawa Senators draft picks
Ottawa Senators players
Sportspeople from Örebro
Swedish ice hockey goaltenders